The 2016 National Lacrosse League season, the 30th in the history of the NLL,  began on January 1, 2016, and ended with the Champion's Cup Finals series on June 4, 2016. The Saskatchewan Rush won their 2nd straight title; their first while located in Saskatchewan.

Milestones and events

Pre-season
May 29, 2015: The Minnesota Swarm announce that they would move to the Arena at Gwinnett Center in Duluth, Georgia as the Georgia Swarm.
 July 20, 2015:  The Edmonton Rush announce that they would move to the SaskTel Centre in Saskatoon, Saskatchewan as the Saskatchewan Rush.
 September 2, 2015: Buffalo Bandits forward John Tavares announced his retirement after 24 seasons. Tavares is the career leader in goals, assists, points, and games played. He will remain with the Bandits organization as an assistant coach.

Standings

Playoffs

*Overtime

Awards

Annual awards

Monthly awards
Awards are presented monthly for the best overall player and best rookie.

Stadiums and locations

See also
 2016 in sports

References

15
National Lacrosse League